The Brockway Area School District is a small, rural public school district located in north west Pennsylvania, US. The District encompasses approximately   spanning portions of two counties. In Elk County it covers a small portion of Horton Township. In Jefferson County it covers the Borough of Brockway and Polk Township, Snyder Township and Washington Township. The district operates one elementary school and Brockway Area Junior/Senior High School. The District is with the Riverview Intermediate Unit 6 region. The Intermediate Unit provides support services and therapy to special education students. It also provides training to school personnel.

Demographics
According to 2000 federal census data, Brockway Area School District served a resident population of 8,455. The resident population declined to 7,537 people in 2010. In 2009, the district residents’ per capita income was $17,828, while the median family income was $40,732. In the Commonwealth, the median family income was $49,501 and the United States median family income was $49,445, in 2010.

Schools 
Brockway Area Elementary School
Brockway Area Junior/Senior High School

Extracurriculars
The district offers a variety of clubs, activities and interscholastic athletics.

Sports
The District funds:

Boys
Baseball – A
Basketball- AA
Cross Country – A
Football – A
Golf – AA
Soccer – A
Tennis – AA
Wrestling	 – AA

Girls
Basketball – A
Cross Country – A
Golf – AA
Soccer (Fall) – A
Softball – A
Girls' Tennis – AA
Volleyball

Junior high school sports

Boys
Basketball
Football
Soccer
Wrestling	

Girls
Basketball
Volleyball 

According to PIAA directory July 2012

References

External links
 Brockway Area School District official website

School districts in Elk County, Pennsylvania
School districts in Jefferson County, Pennsylvania